Lin Ming-yi (1 June 1954 – 20 June 2007) was a Taiwanese politician.

Born in Yunlin County, Lin attended elementary school in Huwei, then Liyang Private Junior High and Chianan Private Vocational High School. He then studied at Tamkang University.

Lin began his political career by serving on the Yunlin County Council. He then ran for the Legislative Yuan in 1992, and won reelection twice in 1995 and 1998. Throughout his tenure in politics, Lin was linked to the Taiwanese underworld. Lin was especially close to Chen Shi-chang, himself a former legislator. Lin Ming-yi was charged with breach of trust in 2003, as a result of an investigation into Liu Tai-ying. The following year, Lin represented the Non-Partisan Solidarity Union as a legislative candidate, but did not win election.

Lin was treated for liver cancer at National Taiwan University Hospital in 2007, and died at home in Huwei on 20 June 2007, aged 53. His funeral was held on 19 July 2007.

References

1954 births
2007 deaths
Yunlin County Members of the Legislative Yuan
Members of the 2nd Legislative Yuan
Members of the 3rd Legislative Yuan
Members of the 4th Legislative Yuan
Kuomintang Members of the Legislative Yuan in Taiwan
Deaths from liver cancer
Deaths from cancer in Taiwan
Tamkang University alumni
Non-Partisan Solidarity Union politicians